Ole David Jensen (born 16 July 1943) is a Danish racewalker. He competed in the men's 50 kilometres walk at the 1972 Summer Olympics.

References

1943 births
Living people
Athletes (track and field) at the 1972 Summer Olympics
Danish male racewalkers
Olympic athletes of Denmark
Place of birth missing (living people)